SM U-3 was the third German U-boat created by the German Empire in their history, and the first of two submarines in its class. The boat was built by Kaiserliche Werft Danzig and was launched on 27 March 1909. U-3 began her career in World War I as a training boat from 1 August 1914 to 11 November 1918. On 1 December 1918, the surrendered boat was being towed to Preston to be broken up when she sank. Unlike the first two U-boat designs, the third design was fitted with a  SK L/40 deck gun.

See also

List of U-boats of Germany

Citations

References

External links

Type U 3 submarines
U-boats commissioned in 1909
World War I submarines of Germany
1909 ships
U-boats sunk in 1918
U-boat accidents
Maritime incidents in 1918